Gradient-related is a term used in multivariable calculus to describe a direction. A direction sequence  is gradient-related to  if for any subsequence  that converges to a nonstationary point, the corresponding subsequence  is bounded and satisfies

Gradient-related directions are usually encountered in the gradient-based iterative optimization of a function .

It is easy to guarantee that the directions generated are gradient-related: for example, they can be set equal to the gradient at each point.

Vector calculus